The Ear  rune of the Anglo-Saxon futhorc is a late addition to the alphabet. It is, however, still attested from epigraphical evidence, notably the Thames scramasax, and its introduction thus cannot postdate the 9th century.

Transliteration
It is transliterated as ea, and the Anglo-Saxon rune poem glosses it as
ᛠ [ear] byþ egle eorla gehƿylcun, /  ðonn[e] fæstlice flæsc onginneþ, /   hraƿ colian, hrusan ceosan /   blac to gebeddan; bleda gedreosaþ, /   ƿynna geƿitaþ, ƿera gesƿicaþ.
"   [ear] is horrible to every knight, /   when the corpse quickly begins to cool /   and is laid in the bosom of the dark earth. /   Prosperity declines, happiness passes away /   and covenants are broken."

Jacob Grimm's interpretation
Jacob Grimm in his 1835 Teutonic Mythology  (ch. 9) attached a deeper significance to the name. 
He interprets the Old English poem as describing "death personified", connected to the death-bringing god of war,  Ares.
He notes that the ear rune is simply a Tyr rune with two barbs attached to it and suggests that Tir and Ear, Old High German  Zio and Eor, were two names of the same god. He finds the name in the toponym of Eresburg (*Eresberc) in Westphalia, in Latin Mons martis. 
Grimm thus suggests that the Germans had adopted the name of Greek  Ares   as an epithet of their god of war, and Eresberc was literally an  Areopagus.
Grimm further notes that in the Bavarian (Marcomannic) area, Tuesday (dies Martis) was known as Ertag, Iertag, Irtag, Eritag, Erchtag, Erichtag as opposed to the Swabian and Swiss (Alemannic) region where the same day is Ziestag as in Anglo-Saxon.
Grimm concludes that Ziu was known by the alternative name Eor, derived from Greek Ares, and also as Saxnot among the Saxons, identified as a god of the sword.

References

See also
Ior

Runes